Ovi are wedding songs in Goa, India, sung during the pre-marriage ceremony known as Chuddo (ceremony during which bangles are worn by the bride) and Sado ceremony during which the red dress sado is stitched by a tailor.

See also
 Deknni
 Mando
 Ver (music)

References

Goan music
Indian wedding traditions
Wedding songs